The Jeanneau Cape Breton, also called the  Jeanneau Cap Breton, is a French trailerable sailboat that was designed as a day sailer-cruiser. It was first built in 1970.

Production
The design was built by Jeanneau in France, starting in 1970, but it is now out of production.

Design
The Cape Breton is a recreational keelboat, built predominantly of fiberglass, with wood trim. It has a fractional sloop rig. The hull has a raked stem, a slightly angled transom, a transom-hung rudder controlled by a tiller and a fixed long keel, with a retractable centerboard. It displaces  and carries  of ballast.

The boat is fitted with a French Renault gasoline engine for docking and maneuvering. It has a hull speed of ..

See also
List of sailing boat types

References

External links

Keelboats
1970s sailboat type designs
Sailing yachts
Trailer sailers
Sailboat types built by Jeanneau